Larry Tagg is an American rock musician, songwriter and producer; a retired high school English and drama teacher; and also an American Civil War historian. He was co-leader of the band Bourgeois Tagg in the 1980s with Brent Bourgeois and has released two solo albums.  After Bourgeois Tagg broke up, Tagg worked as a staff songwriter for Warner/Chappell Music. Tagg has also published a number of works on Civil War history. Tagg is the older brother of musician Eric Tagg.

Early life and education 

Born in Lincoln, Illinois, Tagg grew up in Illinois and Dallas, Texas.  As a high school senior in 1969 he attended a concert by Jimi Hendrix, walked backstage, and talked with drummer Mitch Mitchell.  He graduated from the University of North Texas with a degree in Philosophy and was awarded a teaching assistantship at the University of Texas but left after one semester.

Bourgeois Tagg 

Tagg moved with Brent Bourgeois to California's Bay Area, and in the late 1970s they played in a Sacramento band called Uncle Rainbow, which included members from Texas and other parts of the South. In 1984, they moved to Sacramento and formed Bourgeois Tagg with guitarist Lyle Workman, drummer Michael Urbano, and keyboardist Scott Moon.  Bourgeois played keyboards, Tagg played bass, and they both shared lead vocal duties.

They released a self-titled debut album in 1986, which produced a hit single "Mutual Surrender (What a Wonderful World)." The following year, they released their second album, Yoyo, which was produced by Todd Rundgren, and had another hit, "I Don't Mind at All," which reached the Top 40 on the Billboard chart.

During this period Bourgeois struggled with addiction to drugs and alcohol. When fellow musician and drinking buddy Charlie Peacock began going to church, Bourgeois followed and became a Christian.  Latent conflicts became exacerbated by Bourgeois' trend toward Christian lyrics and the band split in 1989 while working on a third album.  The band members appear on Rundgren's 1989 album Nearly Human, and they toured as part of Rundgren's backing band.

Tagg also played as part of Hall & Oates touring band.

Staff songwriter 

During the 1990s Tagg worked as a staff songwriter for Warner/Chappell Music.  Some songs he wrote were recorded by Kim Carnes, Eddie Money, Lee Ritenour, Jenni Muldaur and others.

Solo recordings 

Tagg released two solo albums: 1995's With a Skeleton Crew and 1997's Rover.  All five members of Bourgeois Tagg appeared on With a Skeleton Crew, with all but Scott Moon playing on the track "1/2 Yes, 1/2 No." Tagg has said that the song was written for the third Bourgeois Tagg album that never materialized, so with Lyle Workman's help, he recorded the song himself.

High school teacher 

By the mid-1990s Tagg had a family, and no longer wanted to remain on the road. He became an English and drama teacher, and lead teacher of the arts academy, at Hiram W. Johnson High School in Sacramento. He began writing in his spare time and has written numerous books on Abraham Lincoln. He taught English, literature, and creative writing at C.K. McClatchy High School in Sacramento, CA until retiring in 2017 to conduct more research on Lincoln.

Historian 

Tagg has written a number of books on Civil War history: 
 The Generals of Gettysburg: The Leaders of America's Greatest Battle, Savas Publishing 1998 (paperback Da Capo Press 2004)
Described by a reviewer as "a thumbnail sketch biography of each of the infantry commanders who took part in the battle, from the brigade level up.  ...should find a home on the bookshelves of those readers whose special interest is Gettysburg."
 The Unpopular Mr. Lincoln: The Story of America's Most Reviled President, Savas Beatie 2009 (paperback Savas Beatie 2012 under new title The Battles that Made Abraham Lincoln: How Lincoln Mastered his Enemies to Win the Civil War, Free the Slaves, and Preserve the Union)
 The Generals of Shiloh: Character In Leadership, April 6–7, 1862, Savas Beatie 2017

References

External links 
 Author Larry Tagg with Great Insight on Abraham Lincoln

Year of birth missing (living people)
Living people
Record producers from Illinois
American rock singers
Historians of the United States
Historians of the American Civil War
21st-century American historians
21st-century American male writers
American male non-fiction writers